Erik Skoglund (1 October 1903 – 22 February 1984) was a Swedish swimmer. He competed at the 1924 Summer Olympics in the 100 m backstroke, but failed to reach the final. His younger brother Nils was an Olympic diver.

References

1903 births
1984 deaths
Olympic swimmers of Sweden
Swimmers at the 1924 Summer Olympics
Swedish male backstroke swimmers
Stockholms KK swimmers
Swimmers from Stockholm